Brecks is a suburb of Rotherham in South Yorkshire, England. It is situated roughly 2 miles from central Rotherham. Brecks borders the suburb Wickersley. The A631 road, here called Bawtry Road, forms the southern boundary of the built-up area.

Villages in South Yorkshire